Mary Roe Walkup (born May 4, 1924) is an American former politician who was a delegate in the Maryland House of Delegates. She represented District 36, which covers Caroline, Cecil, Kent and Queen Anne's Counties.

Background
First elected in 1994, she won one of two seats left open by R. Clayton Mitchell and C. Ronald Franks, serving alongside Wheeler R. Baker and Ronald A. Guns.  In 1998, delegates were elected by county, in which case Walkup defeated Democratic challenger Clarence Hawkins for the seat in Kent County.  In 2002, the election returned to the District selecting three delegates from the list.  She was one of three Republicans, the others being Richard Sossi and Michael D. Smigiel, Sr., that helped unseat incumbent Wheeler R. Baker.  Finally, in 2006, the election returned to voting for one candidate per county, and she won reelection by defeating Joan O. Horsey.

Education
Walkup attended Kent County public schools. She graduated from the University of Maryland School of Nursing with her R.N. in 1945.

Career
After college, Walkup was a nurse at the University of Maryland Hospital.  In 1978, she was elected to the Board of County Commissioners for Kent County, serving two terms, the second term as President.

Walkup has also been a lifelong advocate of environmental matters.  She served for four years starting in 1982 as a delegate for the Legislative Committee on the Maryland Association of Counties. She is a charter member of Kent Conservation, Inc., as citizens' watchdog group founded in 1969 that focuses on environmental issues in Kent County.

Walkup is also a member of the Kent Chapter of the American Red Cross, Kent County Farm Bureau, the Chester River Association, the Eastern Shore Land Conservancy, and the Maryland Conservation Council. In 1977, she received the Conservationist of the Year from the Maryland Wildlife Federation.

In the legislature
As a member of the Maryland House of Delegates, Walkup served on the Economic Matters Committee beginning in 1995, and several other subcommittees.

Legislative notes
 voted for the Clean Indoor Air Act of 2007 (HB359)
 voted for the Healthy Air Act in 2006 (SB154)
 voted for slots in 2005 (HB1361)
 voted for electric deregulation in 1999 (HB703)
 voted for income tax reduction in 1998 (SB750)
 voted against in-state tuition for illegal immigrants in 2007 (HB6)

Election results
2006 Race for Maryland House of Delegates – District 36 - Kent County
Voters to choose three:
{| class="wikitable"
!Name
!Votes
!Percent
!Outcome
|-
|-
|Mary Roe Walkup, Rep.
|19,430
|  59.0%
|   Won
|-
|-
|Joan O. Horsey, Dem.
|13,498
|  41.0%
|   Won
|}

2002 Race for Maryland House of Delegates – District 36
Voters to choose three:
{| class="wikitable"
!Name
!Votes
!Percent
!Outcome
|-
|-
|Richard Sossi, Rep.
|19,098
|  19.0%
|   Won
|-
|-
|Michael D. Smigiel, Sr., Rep.
|19,216
|  19.1%
|   Won
|-
|-
|Mary Roe Walkup, Rep.
|28,230
|  28.0%
|   Won
|-
|-
|Wheeler R. Baker, Dem.
|17,575
|  17.5%
|   Lost
|-
|-
|James G. Crouse, Dem.
|16,329
|  16.2%
|   Lost
|-
|Other Write-Ins
|277
|  0.3%
|   
|}

1998 Race for Maryland House of Delegates – District 36 - Kent County
Voters to choose one for each county:
{| class="wikitable"
!Name
!Votes
!Percent
!Outcome
|-
|-
|Mary Roe Walkup, Rep.
|17,720
|  58%
|   Won
|-
|-
|Clarence A. Hawkins, Dem.
|12,655
|  42%
|   Lost
|}

1994 Race for Maryland House of Delegates – District 36
Voters to choose three:
{| class="wikitable"
!Name
!Votes
!Percent
!Outcome
|-
|-
|Mary Roe Walkup, Rep.
|13,589
|  18%
|   Won
|-
|-
|Wheeler R. Baker, Dem.
|13,911
|  18%
|   Won
|-
|-
|Ronald A. Guns, Dem.
|14,915
|  20%
|   Won
|-
|-
|W. Michael Newnam, Rep.
|11,874
|  16%
|   Lost
|-
|-
|Sharon Maenner Carrick, Rep.
|11,350
|  15%
|   Lost
|-
|-
|Allaire D. Williams, Rep.
|10,796
|  14%
|   Lost
|}

References and notes

External links
 
 msa.md.gov

1924 births
Living people
21st-century American politicians
21st-century American women politicians
Republican Party members of the Maryland House of Delegates
People from Kent County, Maryland
Women state legislators in Maryland